Tindersticks is a British rock band. It is also the name of two eponymous albums by that band:

Tindersticks (1993 album), the band's debut album
Tindersticks (1995 album), the band's second album